PS Solent was a passenger vessel built for the Solent Steam Packet Company in 1863.

History

She was built by George Inman of Lymington and launched on 1 May 1863.   She went to Southampton in June 1863 for the fitting of her engines by J. Hodgkinson.  She undertook her trial trip on 29 October 1863 from Lymington to Stokes Bay.

She was acquired by the London and South Western Railway in 1884.

She was disposed of around 1901.

References

1863 ships
Steamships of the United Kingdom
Paddle steamers of the United Kingdom
Ships of the London and South Western Railway